The Haskell Fighting Indians football team represented the Haskell Institute, later known as Haskell Indian Nations University, in college football.  They fielded their first football team in 1895.

From the late 19th century and continuing through the early 1930s, Haskell's football program regularly scheduled games against regional and national powers and became known as the "Powerhouse of the West".

The program had its earliest success in the early 1900s with a combined record of 38–8–1 from 1900 to 1904. The 1909 team compiled a 7–2 record including victories over Texas and Nebraska.

The team experienced further success under head coach A. R. Kennedy from 1911 to 1915.  His 1913 team compiled a 10–1 record, including a 28–0 victory over Texas A&M. After Kennedy departed, the success continued as the 1919 team compiled an 8–1–1 record, including victories over Oklahoma A&M and Kansas State.

The program reached its peak of prominence during the tenure of head coach Dick Hanley from 1922 to 1926. Hanley's teams compiled a 47–9–4 record, including an undefeated season for the 1926 team.  Prominent players on Hanley's teams included backs John Levi and Mayes McLain. Levi was selected as a first-team All-American in 1923, and McLain set all-time college football scoring records in 1926 with 38 rushing touchdowns, 253 points scored, and a scoring average of 23 points per game.

The program also enjoyed success under head coach William Henry Dietz. Dietz' teams compiled records of 6–2 in 1929 and 9–1 in 1930. Louis Weller starred at halfback during these years.

In the early 1930s, the Bureau of Indian Affairs eliminated junior college courses and reduced the school's emphasis on intercollegiate athletics. After the 1938 season, Haskell dropped intercollegiate football altogether.

After a hiatus of more than 50 years, Haskell revived its college football program in 1990.  The revival lasted less than 25 years, as the program was again dropped in 2015 due to funding shortfalls.

References

 
1896 establishments in Kansas
1938 disestablishments in Kansas
1990 establishments in Kansas
2015 disestablishments in Kansas
American football teams established in 1896
American football teams disestablished in 1938
American football teams established in 1990
American football teams disestablished in 2015